Mahudha is a municipality in Kheda district in the Indian state of Gujarat.

Mahudha is about 25 kilometres away (SE) from the pilgrim town of Dakor. The nearest city, Nadiad, is 16 kilometres south west.

Geography 
It has an average elevation of 37 metres (121 feet).

Demographics 
At the 2001 India census, Mahudha had a population of 15,780. Males constitute 52% of the population and females 48%. Mahudha has an average literacy rate of 69%, higher than the national average of 59.5%: male literacy is 78%, and female literacy is 59%. In Mahudha, 11% of the population is under 6 years of age.

Religions 
Majority of the residents are Muslim (70%) and, followed by Hindu (28%) as the second largest religious group. There is also a small Christian community (2%) and traces of worshipers from other religions such as Sikh, Jain, and Buddhist.

References

External links 
USA based community website on Mahudha (Gujarati and English)

Cities and towns in Kheda district